Frances Cecilia Jonas (born 8 April 2004) is a New Zealand cricketer who plays for Auckland as a slow left-arm orthodox bowler. In February 2021, Jonas earned her maiden call-up to the New Zealand women's cricket team, for their Women's One Day International (WODI) matches against England.

Career
Jonas is a left-arm orthodox spinner. She started playing cricket at the age of six, and until the age of 10, she played in boy's teams. She has played for Cornwall Cricket Club in Auckland, New Zealand, as well as the New Zealand under-22s indoor cricket team.

In December 2019, at the age of 15, Jonas made her debut for Auckland Hearts in the 2019–20 Hallyburton Johnstone Shield. She took three wickets in the Hallyburton Johnstone Shield final, as Auckland Hearts beat Northern Spirit. She was at one point in the season the fourth highest wicket taker in the 2020–21 Hallyburton Johnstone Shield, with nine wickets. Jonas also took eight wickets for Auckland Hearts in the 2020–21 Super Smash competition.

In September 2020, Jonas was given a development contract by the New Zealand women's cricket team; she was the youngest player to receive a development contract. In January 2021, Jonas was named in the New Zealand under-19s squad for matches against a New Zealand Police women's team and a New Zealand provincial team, to take place between February and April 2021. In February 2021, Jonas earned her maiden call-up to the New Zealand women's cricket team, for their Women's One Day International (WODI) matches against England.  As part of the preparation for the series, she played in two warm-up matches for the New Zealand XI Women's team, taking two wickets. She made her WODI debut for New Zealand, against England, on 23 February 2021.

In March 2021, Jonas was named in New Zealand's Women's Twenty20 International (WT20I) squad for their series against Australia. In February 2022, she was named in New Zealand's team for the 2022 Women's Cricket World Cup in New Zealand. In June 2022, Jonas was named in New Zealand's team for the cricket tournament at the 2022 Commonwealth Games in Birmingham, England. Jonas made her WT20I debut on 30 July 2022, for New Zealand against South Africa at the Commonwealth Games.

In December 2022, Jonas was selected in the New Zealand Under-19 squad for the 2023 ICC Under-19 Women's T20 World Cup.

Personal life
Jonas was a student at Baradene College of the Sacred Heart. Her elder brother is also a cricketer, and her father is her coach.

References

External links
 
 

2004 births
Living people
New Zealand women cricketers
New Zealand women One Day International cricketers
New Zealand women Twenty20 International cricketers
Cricketers from Auckland
Auckland Hearts cricketers
People educated at Baradene College of the Sacred Heart
Cricketers at the 2022 Commonwealth Games
Commonwealth Games bronze medallists for New Zealand
Commonwealth Games medallists in cricket
Medallists at the 2022 Commonwealth Games